Gleason Building may refer to:

 Gleason Building (Lawrence, Massachusetts), NRHP-listed
 Gleason Building (Stevensville, Montana), listed on the NRHP in Ravalli, Montana

See also
Gleason House (disambiguation)